Alfie Monk (1933 – 30 March 2020) was an Irish Gaelic footballer who played at club level with Julianstown, St Patrick's and Naomh Mhuire and at inter-county level with the Meath junior football team and the Louth senior football team. He usually lined out as a left wing-forward.

Honours

Julianstown
Meath Minor Football Championship (3): 1947, 1948, 1949

St. Patrick's
Meath Intermediate Football Championship (1): 1951

Naomh Mhuire
Louth Senior Football Championship (1): 1953

Louth
All-Ireland Senior Football Championship (1): 1957
Leinster Senior Football Championship (2): 1953, 1957

References

1933 births
2020 deaths
Julianstown Gaelic footballers
St Patrick's (Meath) Gaelic footballers
Meath inter-county Gaelic footballers
Roscommon inter-county Gaelic footballers
Sportspeople from County Louth